Jim O'Callaghan (born 5 January 1968) is an Irish Fianna Fáil politician who has been a Teachta Dála (TD) for the Dublin Bay South constituency since the 2016 general election.

Legal career
O'Callaghan has a BCL degree from University College Dublin, a master's degree in law and an M.Phil. in criminology from Sidney Sussex College, at Cambridge University, and a barrister-at-law degree from the King's Inns.

In 2000, he represented Taoiseach Bertie Ahern in defamation proceedings against a businessman, appearing with future Attorneys General Rory Brady and Paul Gallagher. As a barrister, he was made a senior counsel in 2008. O'Callaghan also served as a legal adviser to Fianna Fáil from January 2011 to his election to the Dáil. In 2014, he co-edited a book titled, Law and Government: A Tribute to Rory Brady. O'Callaghan had devilled for Brady, who was later appointed Attorney General of Ireland.

Political career
He was a member of Dublin City Council from 2009 to 2016. He unsuccessfully ran as a candidate for Fianna Fáil in the 2007 general election in Dublin South-East. O'Callaghan practises as a barrister and is a senior counsel.

He was a member of the Fianna Fáil negotiating team in talks on government formation in 2016. Early on 9 April 2016, O'Callaghan's home hosted a covert meeting between O'Callaghan, Leo Varadkar, Deirdre Gillane (chief adviser of Micheál Martin) and Andrew McDowell (a policy adviser of Enda Kenny). It lasted for more than an hour.

On 19 May 2016, he was appointed as Fianna Fáil Spokesperson for Justice and Equality, by party leader Micheál Martin. As the Opposition Spokesperson for Justice and Equality, he drafted and secured cross-party support his Parole Bill which was passed by the Oireachtas and became an Act. It reformed the parole system giving victims of crime and their families the right to be heard during the parole process.

O’Callaghan also introduced a Judicial Appointments Commission Bill on 18 October 2016 that sought to amend the process by which judges were appointed. Although the Bill passed second stage of Dáil Éireann., it was not supported by the Fine Gael minority Government which instead pursued legislation proposed by the Minister for Transport, Shane Ross, though with changes.

In November 2016, O'Callaghan met with some of those who had been sexually abused as boys by Bill Kenneally, Fianna Fáil tallyman and cousin of former Fianna Fáil TD Brendan Kenneally. Brendan Kenneally had previously acknowledged that he had been aware of his cousin's crimes before his sentencing to 14 years imprisonment. On 10 July 2018 the Government established a Commission of Investigation under Judge Barry Hickson to investigate the Kenneally allegations.

At the general election in February 2020, O'Callaghan was re-elected as a TD for the Dublin Bay South constituency. In July 2020 O'Callaghan declined the position of Minister of State at the Department of Justice in the Government of the 33rd Dáil offered to him by Taoiseach Micheál Martin, stating that he wished to remain on the backbenches, providing a voice in Fianna Fáil outside of government, while also making the party more attractive to younger voters. In September 2020 O’Callaghan told RTÉ radio he was, in fact, interested in becoming the leader of Fianna Fáil following Martin. 

O’Callaghan was appointed as the party’s spokesman on justice matters by Martin on 17 December 2020.

O'Callaghan was the Fianna Fáil Director of Elections for the 2021 Dublin Bay South by-election.

Personal life
He played rugby at a senior level, representing UCD, Cambridge University, London Irish, Wanderers, Leinster and Connacht. He was also capped for Ireland at under-21 level. He is a frequent cyclist, regularly cycling to Leinster House and advocates for the expansion of cycling infrastructure in Dublin.

He has four sisters, one of whom is the Irish broadcaster Miriam O'Callaghan.

References

External links
Jim O'Callaghan's page on the Fianna Fáil website

 

1968 births
Living people
Fianna Fáil TDs
Irish barristers
Local councillors in Dublin (city)
Members of the 32nd Dáil
Members of the 33rd Dáil
Alumni of University College Dublin
Alumni of the University of Cambridge
Alumni of King's Inns
Alumni of Sidney Sussex College, Cambridge